The 2013 MTV EMAs (also known as the MTV Europe Music Awards) were held at the Ziggo Dome, Amsterdam, Netherlands, on 10 November 2013. This was the second time the awards had taken place in the Netherlands, the last time being in 1997.

Several performances of the main show were performed at different locations in Amsterdam than the Ziggo Dome. Dutch DJ Afrojack performed at the Melkweg and was joined by Snoop Lion for the performance of 'Gin and Juice'. The American band Imagine Dragons performed their song 'Radioactive' at the Heineken Music Hall.

Nominations
Winners are in bold text.

Regional nominations
Winners are in bold text.

Northern Europe

Southern Europe

Central Europe

Eastern Europe

Africa, Middle East and India

Japan and Korea

Southeast Asia, Mainland China, Hong Kong and Taiwan

Australia and New Zealand

Latin America

North America

Worldwide nominations
Winners are in bold text.

Performances

Pre show

Main show

Appearances

Pre show
 Louise Roe and Laura Whitmore —  Red carpet hosts
 Ellie Goulding — presented Best Look 
 Dizzee Rascal — presented Biggest Fans

Main show
 Carice van Houten and Colton Haynes — presented Best Song
 Rita Ora — presented Best Hip-Hop
 Ellie Goulding — presented Best Alternative
 Bridgit Mendler and R.J. Mitte — presented Best Female
 Iggy Azalea and Ariana Grande — presented Best Male
 Jared Leto — presented Best Worldwide Act
 Will Ferrell (as Ron Burgundy) — presented Global Icon
 Will Ferrell — presented Best Video

See also
2013 MTV Video Music Awards

References

External links

2013
MTV Europe Music Awards, 2013
MTV Europe Music Awards, 2013
MTV Europe Music Awards, 2013
MTV Europe Music Awards, 2013
MTV Europe Music Awards